The 1974–75 Lebanese Premier League season was the 28th season of the Lebanese Premier League, the top Lebanese professional league for association football clubs in the country, established in 1934.

Nejmeh were the defending champions. They won their second consecutive Lebanese Premier League title, and second overall, scoring 42 goals in 22 games.

Teams

Stadiums and locations

League table

Season statistics

Top goalscorers

References 

Lebanese Premier League seasons
Lebanon
1